Garfield Peak is a prominent mountain in the U.S. state of Wyoming. It is the highest point in the Rattlesnake Hills.

References
 
 
 

Mountains of Wyoming
Mountains of Natrona County, Wyoming